Okeljan Baze (born 24 April 1991) is an Albanian footballer who currently plays as a midfielder for Lushnja in the Albanian First Division.

References

1991 births
Living people
Sportspeople from Lushnjë
Albanian footballers
Association football midfielders
KS Lushnja players
FC Kamza players
KS Pogradeci players
KF Tërbuni Pukë players
KF Butrinti players
KS Egnatia Rrogozhinë players